Harold Ernest Palmer (March 1901 – 12 March 1964) was a British cinematographer. He worked on some 130 feature films and TV series episodes between 1930 and 1963.

Selected filmography
 Children of Chance (1930)
 Children of Fortune (1931)
 The Innocents of Chicago (1932)
 After Office Hours (1932)
 Verdict of the Sea (1932)
 The Ghost Camera (1933)
 The Umbrella (1933)
 His Grace Gives Notice (1933)
 Flood Tide (1934)
 The River Wolves (1934)
 The Admiral's Secret (1934)
 Music Hall (1934)
 Whispering Tongues (1934)
 The Black Abbot (1934)
 The Ace of Spades (1935)
 While Parents Sleep (1935)
 That's My Uncle (1935)
 Death on the Set (1935)
 Birds of a Feather (1936)
 Grand Finale (1936)
 The Man Behind the Mask [a.k.a. Behind the Mask (UK reissue title)] (1936)
 The Edge of the World (1937)
 Rhythm Racketeer (1937)
The Last Chance (1937)
 Save a Little Sunshine (1938)
 Murder Tomorrow (1938)
 Bedtime Story (1938)
 What a Man! (1938)
 The Stars Look Down (1939) [uncredited]
 The Spider (1940)
 Law and Disorder (1940)
 The Next of Kin (1942)
 He Found a Star (1941)
 The Goose Steps Out (1942)
 San Demetrio London (1943)
 For You Alone (1945)
 29 Acacia Avenue [a.k.a. The Facts of Love (USA)] (1945)
 Murder in Reverse? (1945)
 Waltz Time (1945)
 Lisbon Story (1946)
 The Trojan Brothers (1946)
 The Ghosts of Berkeley Square (1947)
 Green Fingers (1947)
 The Three Weird Sisters (1948)
 But Not in Vain (1948)
 School for Randle (1949)
 Let's Have a Murder (1950)
 Over the Garden Wall (1950)
 The Changing Face of Europe [a.k.a. The Grand Design (UK)] (1951) (segment 3 "Somewhere to Live")
 Love's a Luxury (1952)
 It's a Grand Life (1953)
 Take a Powder (1953)
 Assignment Redhead (1956)
 The Heart Within (1957)
 The Woman Eater (1958)
 The Crowning Touch (1959)

References

External links
 

1901 births
1964 deaths
People from St Pancras, London
British cinematographers